Matteo Romano (born 20 March 2002) is an Italian singer-songwriter.

Biography
Romano was born in Cuneo. His music career began in 2020 when he released a preview of what will become his debut single "Concedimi" on the social platform TikTok. The video went viral in Italy, reaching over 3 million likes. The single was subsequently published on all platforms on the following 17 November.

In March 2021, he obtained a recording contract with the label Universal Music Italia, and released the next single "Casa di specchi". Romano placed third during the show, with his entry "Testa e croce", by rightfully accessing the festival in the  category. "Virale" was later announced as his entry for the Sanremo Music Festival 2022.

Discography

Singles

References

Italian singer-songwriters
Living people
21st-century Italian singers
2002 births
People from Cuneo